This is the discography of solo recordings by the singer-songwriter Bob Geldof who is also known as the lead vocalist of the Irish new wave band Boomtown Rats which performed from 1977 to 1985 and reformed in 2013.

Solo albums

Compilation albums

Singles

Notes

A^ "This Is the World Calling" also charted at #23 on Billboard Mainstream Rock Tracks Chart.
B^ "Love or Something" charted at #24 on Billboard Modern Rock Tracks Chart.

References

Geldof, Bob